Daryl Joseph Mitchell (born 20 May 1991) is a New Zealand cricketer who plays all formats of the game for the New Zealand national team and represents Canterbury in domestic cricket. He is the son of New Zealand rugby union coach and former player John Mitchell.

After appearing in over 200 domestic matches in New Zealand's domestic cricket system, Mitchell finally made his international debut in 2019. Mitchell is known for his adaptability and went onto cement his reputation of playing any given role assigned to him at international level. He nailed his reputation as a bankable finisher especially noted for his ability to finish the games. He had been one of the most impactful players in the Super Smash and renowned for having hit most number of sixes in Super Smash prior to his late entry to international cricket. He is often confused by fans and English cricket pundits as his namesake Daryl Mitchell is also a right-handed batting all-rounder originally from England who has predominantly played for Worcestershire at county level.

Early life 
He was still pursuing his bachelor's degree in exercise and sports science when he turned up at Northern Districts in 2012 at the age of 20. He is reported to have lived in Australia's Perth for five of his formative years and he even shared the field with some of the Australian cricketers including the likes of Andrew Tye, Marcus Harris and Marcus Stoinis especially through the school and grade ranks in Western Australia. In March 2009, Daryl Mitchell, Marcus Stoinis and Justin Langer sat together as team-mates in the changerooms at the WACA celebrating a first-grade premiership for Scarborough. During his three years with Hale in school cricket and two years with Scarborough at club cricket, Mitchell also played for the Western Australia Under 19s, Under 23s and for the Australian Centre of Excellence, which was part of a Futures League T20 competition. Following his impressive showing in Australian third grade level competitions, he received a contract from Northern Districts which he gladly accepted and since became a regular in New Zealand domestic circuit. As a teenager, he and his family moved to Western Australia in 2006 when his father John, got the position of head coach of the Western Force rugby union side.

Domestic career 
In June 2018, he was awarded a contract with Northern Districts for the 2018–19 season. 

In June 2020, Mitchell moved from Northern Districts to Canterbury. In November 2020, in the fourth round of the 2020–21 Plunket Shield season, Mitchell took his first five-wicket haul in first-class cricket, with 5/44 against Otago.

In May 2021, Mitchell was awarded with his first central contract by New Zealand Cricket, ahead of the 2021–22 season. That month, he was also signed by Middlesex for the latter part of the 2021 t20 Blast.

In February 2022, he was bought by the Rajasthan Royals in the auction for the 2022 Indian Premier League tournament.

In January 2023 Lancashire announced that Mitchell would be playing for the county in both the County Championship and T20 Blast in the 2022-23 season.

International career 
In January 2019, he was named in New Zealand's Twenty20 International (T20I) squad for their series against India. He made his T20I debut for New Zealand against India on 6 February 2019. In November 2019, he was added to New Zealand's Test squad for the second Test against England. He made his Test debut for New Zealand, against England, on 29 November 2019.

In January 2021, in the second Test against Pakistan, Mitchell scored his first century in Test cricket, with an unbeaten 102 runs. In March 2021, Mitchell was named in New Zealand's One Day International (ODI) squad for their series against Bangladesh. He made his ODI debut for New Zealand on 20 March 2021, against Bangladesh. On 26 March 2021, Mitchell scored his first century in ODI cricket, in the third match of the series against Bangladesh.

2021 ICC T20 World Cup 
In August 2021, Mitchell was named in New Zealand's squad for the 2021 ICC Men's T20 World Cup.

He opened the batting alongside Martin Guptill during the entirety of the 2021 ICC Men's T20 World Cup although a role he had never done before. He had played in 116 T20 matches prior to the 2021 ICC T20 World Cup where he had never opened the batting in any of those matches. He was promoted to open the innings during the 2021 edition of the T20 World Cup by the then head coach Gary Stead. Prior to the 2021 T20 World Cup, New Zealand coaching staff and management intended to give Mitchell the finishing role in the middle order along with Jimmy Neesham. However, the plans had to be changed later, courtesy of late arrival of first choice opener Tim Seifert who joined the bio-secure bubble pity late due to the latter's involvement with the Kolkata Knight Riders franchise during the 2021 Indian Premier League and as a result, Daryl Mitchell went onto become an accidental opener of New Zealand cricket. 

In the team's semi-final against England, he opened the batting and scored 72 not out, with New Zealand winning the match by five wickets; Mitchell was awarded the player of the match. He ended the 2021 T20 World Cup campaign on a higher note having notched up impressive returns with the bat as an opener in his first ever experience of having opened the batting in a tournament, scoring 208 runs in seven innings, averaging 34.66 with the bat and with a strike rate of 140.54. His batting prowess was also one of the crucial reasons which helped New Zealand to reach the 2021 T20 World Cup final.

2022 England test tour 
Mitchell endured a highly successful test tour to England in July 2022 where he piled up a mammoth runfest aggregating a record 538 runs with a stellar average of 107.60 in the three match test series although New Zealand ended the test tour on a receiving end after being whitewashed by the home side 3-0. Mitchell turned out to be one of the only two brighting sparks alongside Tom Blundell for the Kiwis during the one sided test series where he scored three centuries in three successive test matches and he went past Martin Donnelly's tally of 462 runs to become the most prolific New Zealand player to have ever scored the most number of runs in a single test series in English soil against England. He also became the first New Zealand batsman to score centuries in three consecutive test matches in England and became only the sixth visiting batsman to score centuries in three successive test match appearances in England. He also became the first batter in the world to score hundreds in each match of an away series of three or more tests. During the test series, he along with wicket-keeper batsman Tom Blundell set a new record for New Zealand for being the most successful New Zealand pair in a test series with an aggregate of 611 partnership runs. His tally of 538 runs in the three-match test series also set a new record for most runs among New Zealand batsmen in a test series. Prior to the England test series in July 2022, Mitchell had not played a red ball first-class match in four months and was not in contention for a test spot for the England tour but was included for the first test match of the series at Lord's later as a replacement to Henry Nicholls whose positive COVID-19 test had played a part in delaying his rehabilitation from a calf injury.

2022 ICC T20 World Cup 
In September 2022, Mitchell was named in New Zealand's squad for the 2022 ICC Men's T20 World Cup.

Rugby 
He also worked as an assistant strength and conditioning coach at Waikato Rugby from 2018 to 2020. He also played rugby at school level during off seasons especially at winter seasons.

Honours 

He was named as the winner of the ICC Spirit of the Cricket Award 2021 during the 2021 ICC Awards in recognition of his act for his decision on not to run for a single after realising that he had obstructed English bowler Adil Rashid on his way during the critical juncture of the closely fought tense semi-final clash between England and New Zealand at Abu Dhabi.

He was nominated for the ICC Player of the Month along with Jonny Bairstow and Joe Root for the month of June 2022.

References

External links
 

1991 births
Living people
Canterbury cricketers
Cricketers from Hamilton, New Zealand
Middlesex cricketers
New Zealand cricketers
New Zealand Test cricketers
New Zealand One Day International cricketers
New Zealand Twenty20 International cricketers
Northern Districts cricketers
Rajasthan Royals cricketers